The 2005 Cologne Centurions season was the second season for the franchise in the NFL Europe League (NFLEL). The team was led by head coach Peter Vaas in his second year, and played its home games at RheinEnergieStadion in Cologne, Germany. They finished the regular season in third place with a record of six wins and four losses.

Offseason

Free agent draft

Personnel

Staff

Roster

Schedule

Standings

Game summaries

Week 1: vs Hamburg Sea Devils

Week 2: at Rhein Fire

Week 3: vs Frankfurt Galaxy

Week 4: vs Amsterdam Admirals

Week 5: at Hamburg Sea Devils

Week 6: vs Berlin Thunder

Week 7: at Frankfurt Galaxy

Week 8: at Amsterdam Admirals

Week 9: vs Rhein Fire

Week 10: at Berlin Thunder

Notes

References

Cologne
Cologne Centurions (NFL Europe) seasons